The 1975–76 European Cup was the 16th edition of Europe's premier club handball tournament.

Knockout stage

Round 1

|}

Round 2

|}

Quarterfinals

|}

Semifinals

|}

Final

|}

Winner's squad
The squad of Borac Banja Luka, 1976 European Champions, was Milorad Karalić, Zdravko Rađenović, Nedeljko Vujinović, Abas Arslanagić, Dobrivoje Selec, Momir Golić, Nebojša Popović, Miro Bjelić, Zoran Ravlić, Boro Golić, Rade Unčanin, Slobodan Vukša, Mile Kekerović, Zlatko Jančić. Coach: Pero Janjić.

External links
 EHF Champions League website
 European Cup 1976 edition

EHF Champions League seasons
Champions League
Champions League